Anthidium afghanistanicum is a species of bee in the family Megachilidae, the leaf-cutter, carder, or mason bees.

Distribution
This species of Megachilidae can be found, like in its binomial name implies, in Afghanistan.

References

afghanistanicum
Insects described in 1965